Thrippangottur  is a Village and a Grama Panchayat in Kannur district in the Indian state of Kerala.

Demographics
As of 2011 Census, Thrippangottur had a population of 29,911, with 13,644 (45.6%) males and 16,267 (54.4%) females. Average sex ratio was 1192 higher than the state average of 1084. In Thrippangottur, 13% of the population was under 6 years of age. Thrippangottur had an average literacy of 94% same as the state average of 94%; male literacy stands at 96.8% and female literacy was 91.7%.

Transportation
The national highway passes through Thalassery town. Mangalore, Goa and Mumbai can be accessed on the northern side and Cochin and Thiruvananthapuram can be accessed on the southern side.  The road to the east of Iritty connects to Mysore and Bangalore.   The nearest railway station is Thalassery on Mangalore-Palakkad line. 
Trains are available to almost all parts of India subject to advance booking over the internet.  There are airports at Kannur and  Kozhikode Calicut. Both of them are international airports but direct flights are available only to Middle Eastern countries.

See also
 Kannavam
 Pinarayi
 Mavilayi
 Panoor
 Peravoor

References

Villages near Thalassery